Jerzy Kruża (born 29 November 1943) is a Polish gymnast. He competed at the 1968 Summer Olympics and the 1972 Summer Olympics.

References

1943 births
Living people
Polish male artistic gymnasts
Olympic gymnasts of Poland
Gymnasts at the 1968 Summer Olympics
Gymnasts at the 1972 Summer Olympics
Sportspeople from Ruda Śląska
20th-century Polish people